Trego County (standard abbreviation: TR) is a county located in the U.S. state of Kansas. As of the 2020 census, the county population was 2,808. Its county seat and largest city is WaKeeney.

History

Early history

For many millennia, the Great Plains of North America was inhabited by nomadic Native Americans. From the 16th century to 18th century, the Kingdom of France claimed ownership of large parts of North America. In 1762, after the French and Indian War, France secretly ceded New France to Spain, per the Treaty of Fontainebleau.

19th century
In 1802, Spain returned most of the land to France, but keeping title to about 7,500 square miles. In 1803, most of the land for modern day Kansas was acquired by the United States from France as part of the 828,000 square mile Louisiana Purchase for 2.83 cents per acre.

In 1854, the Kansas Territory was organized, then in 1861 Kansas became the 34th U.S. state. In 1879, Trego County was established.

Geography

Adjacent counties
 Graham County (north)
 Rooks County (northeast)
 Ellis County (east)
 Ness County (south)
 Gove County (west)

Major highways
  Interstate 70
  U.S. Route 40
  U.S. Route 283
  K-147

Demographics

As of the census of 2000, there were 3,319 people, 1,412 households, and 936 families residing in the county. The racial makeup of the county was 97.77% White, 0.18% Black or African American, 0.39% Native American, 0.48% Asian, 0.06% Pacific Islander, 0.15% from other races, and 0.96% from two or more races. 0.78% of the population were Hispanic or Latino of any race.

There were 1,412 households, out of which 27.30% had children under the age of 18 living with them, 58.10% were married couples living together, 6.30% had a female householder with no husband present, and 33.70% were non-families. 31.40% of all households were made up of individuals, and 17.70% had someone living alone who was 65 years of age or older. The average household size was 2.27 and the average family size was 2.86.

In the county, the population was spread out, with 23.90% under the age of 18, 5.50% from 18 to 24, 23.50% from 25 to 44, 23.20% from 45 to 64, and 24.00% who were 65 years of age or older. The median age was 44 years. For every 100 females there were 91.10 males. For every 100 females age 18 and over, there were 87.60 males.

The median income for a household in the county was $29,677, and the median income for a family was $40,524. Males had a median income of $26,545 versus $16,927 for females. The per capita income for the county was $16,239. About 11.20% of families and 12.30% of the population were below the poverty line, including 14.10% of those under age 18 and 12.00% of those age 65 or over.

Government

Presidential elections
Trego County is often carried by Republican candidates. The last time a Democratic candidate has carried this county was in 1964. The county has generally voted for Republican candidates by a larger margin by each passing election.

Laws
Trego County was a prohibition, or "dry", county until the Kansas Constitution was amended in 1986 and voters approved the sale of alcoholic liquor by the individual drink with a 30 percent food sales requirement.

Education

Unified school districts
 WaKeeney USD 208

Communities

Cities
 Collyer
 WaKeeney

Unincorporated communities
† means a Census-Designated Place (CDP) by the United States Census Bureau.
 Ogallah†
 Riga
 Voda

Ghost towns
 Banner
 Bosna
 Cyrus
 Wilcox

Townships
Trego County is divided into seven townships. None of the cities within the county are considered governmentally independent, and all figures for the townships include those of the cities. In the following table, the population center is the largest city (or cities) included in that township's population total, if it is of a significant size.

Former towns and settlements in the county include Wilcox.

Gallery

See also

References

Notes

Further reading

 Standard Atlas of Trego County, Kansas; Geo. A. Ogle & Co; 57 pages; 1906.

External links

County
 
 Trego County - Directory of Public Officials
Maps
 Trego County Maps: Current, Historic, KDOT
 Kansas Highway Maps: Current, Historic, KDOT
 Kansas Railroad Maps: Current, 1996, 1915, KDOT and Kansas Historical Society

 
Kansas counties
1879 establishments in Kansas
Populated places established in 1879